Stop Drop and Roll!!! is the debut studio album by the American rock band the Foxboro Hot Tubs. The full album was first available for digital download on April 22, 2008, and was released on CD on May 20, 2008. The title track "Stop Drop and Roll" was featured in the 2010 American comedy film Get Him to the Greek, although it was not on the soundtrack album.

The album sold 19,000 copies in its first week of availability in the US, and went on to sell over 55,000 copies there.

Background and recording
The album was recorded while Green Day were writing their eighth studio album 21st Century Breakdown; they ended up recording this album because they "love to play music and be spontaneous, and after a few late night jams and a few too many bottles of wine, we were inspired to record some rockin' eight-track recordings". The album was initially available as a free download on the band's website as a 6 track EP. These tracks would later go on to be on the full album release (with the exception of the track "Highway 1", which was replaced by new track "Broadway"). On the free download, all the songs had samples from 1960s and 1970s films at the start; however, these were removed for the final release.

Cover art and packaging
The original album art shown on the band's official website in December 2007 was updated for its full release in 2008 and had replaced the track "Highway 1" on the front cover with "Mother Mary" (the first single which also turned into a surprise radio hit).

The physical album release comes with the CD in a cardboard sleeve reminiscent of vinyl records, with the CD face resembling a vinyl record. The album is also referred to as having a "Side A" and "Side B" like vinyl-era albums. The vinyl edition came with a free CD of the album.

The CD also came with a warning on "side A" that said "Warning: Do Not Play Side B."

Track listing

"Highway 1" was originally on the album in place of "Broadway" but was omitted from the final album.

Personnel
 Reverend Strychnine Twitch – lead vocals
 Mike Dirnt – bass guitar, backing vocals
 Tré Cool – drums, percussion, backing vocals
 Frosco Lee – lead guitar, backing vocals 
 Jason Freese – keyboard, saxophone, flute, backing vocals
 Kevin Preston – rhythm guitar, backing vocals

Production
 Chris Dugan – recording, mixing on a 1/4" 8 track ("Dark Side of Night" recorded on a 4 track)
 Ken Lee – mastering
 Jason Chandler – artwork

Charts

References

External links
Stop Drop and Roll

2008 debut albums
Albums free for download by copyright owner
Foxboro Hot Tubs albums
Self-released albums
Warner Music Group albums

fr:Stop Drop and Roll